The pair skating event was held as part of the figure skating at the 1948 Winter Olympics. It was the seventh appearance of the event, which had previously been held twice at the Summer Olympics in 1908 and 1920 and at all four Winter Games from 1924 onward. The competition was held on 7 February 1948. Thirty figure skaters from eleven nations competed.

Results

Referee:
  Gustavus F.C. Witt

Assistant Referee:
  James Koch

Judges:
  Christen Christensen
  M. Bernard Fox
  Rudolf Kaler
  Eugen Kirchhofer
  Vladimír Koudelka
  Mollie Phillips
  Melville F. Rogers
  Elemér Terták
  Georges Torchon
  Mario Verdi

References

Figure skating at the 1948 Winter Olympics
1948 in figure skating
Mixed events at the 1948 Winter Olympics